E (styled as Ǝ) is a compilation video album by American rapper Eminem, released in DVD and VHS formats. It was released on December 19, 2000, through Aftermath/Interscope Records. It is composed of seven music videos from The Slim Shady LP and The Marshall Mathers LP, the making of the "Stan" video, a short movie titled "The Mathers Home" and a hidden "Shit on You" video from then upcoming D12's album Devils Night. Ǝ peaked at number 5 on the Billboard's Music Video Sales chart and was certified Platinum by the Recording Industry Association of America. It was also certified Platinum by Music Canada and 2× Platinum by British Phonographic Industry.

Track listing

Charts

Certifications

References

External links

IMDB Webpage

2000 video albums
Eminem video albums
2000 compilation albums
Music video compilation albums